This is a list of television channels that broadcast in the Balochi language.

Current channels

News
 VSH News

General entertainment
 Balochistan TV (Balochi)
 PTV Bolan
 PTV National (partially available in Balochi)
 Sabzbaat Balochistan TV

Former channels

General entertainment
 PTV Balochistan

See also
 Balochi cinema

Balochi language
Balochistan
Balochi
Balochi